Brochów  is a village (population 400) in Sochaczew County, Masovian Voivodeship,  east-central Poland.

It was in the church at Brochów that Nicolas Chopin and Justyna Krzyżanowska, parents of future composer Frédéric Chopin, were married on 2 June 1806. Frédéric was baptized there on 23 April 1810.

During the Invasion of Poland in World War II, on 15 September 1939, Brochów was the site of a successful cavalry charge against German infantry by the 17th Greater Poland Uhlan Regiment.

References

Villages in Sochaczew County